Narrow-gauge railways were used extensively in the  slate industry of Great Britain, especially in Wales. Many quarries had internal tramways, some using many dozens of miles of track. Others had private lines that stretched from the quarry to transhipment points on local railways, rivers, roads or coastal ports.

Wales

Rest of Britain

References

Bibliography 
 
 

 
Industrial railways in Wales
Narrow gauge